Shtickmen is a mockumentary film about the life of struggling comedians, and the things they have to do to make a living.  It stars Dean Lewis, Jeff Hays, Burton Gilliam, David Wilk and Gordon Keith.  It was released in 2003 and subsequently received 5 awards at various festivals around the world. This led to a distribution deal with Blockbuster Video, where it was released in January 2006.

References

External links
Shtickmen at the Internet Movie Database.

American independent films
American mockumentary films
2003 films
2003 comedy films
2000s American films